Mashhad is a city in Iran.

Mashhad may also refer to:

Places

Iran
Mashhad-e Kaveh, a village in Isfahan Province, Iran
Mashhad, Khuzestan, a village in Khuzestan Province, Iran
Mashhad ol Kubeh, a village in Markazi Province, Iran
Mashhad-e Bazarjan, a village in Markazi Province, Iran
Mashhad-e Miqan, a village in Markazi Province, Iran
Mashhad-e Zolfabad, a village in Markazi Province, Iran
Mashhad, Qazvin, a village in Qazvin Province, Iran
Mashhad-e Ardehal, a village in Iran
Mashhad-e Firuzkuh, a village in Tehran Province, Iran
Mashhad County, a county (shahrestān) in Razavi Khorasan Province in Iran
Mashhad-e Miqan Rural District, in Markazi Province, Iran

Elsewhere
Mashhad, Afghanistan
Mashhad, Israel, an Arab town in northern Israel

Other uses
Mashad (architecture), a Muslim mausoleum or shrine of a religious figure